This is the 2006–07 season in review for the Professional Bowlers Association (PBA) Tour. It was the Tour's 48th season and consisted of 21 events.

Season highlights
 Walter Ray Williams Jr. broke Earl Anthony's PBA record for career standard titles with his 42nd win in the opening Dydo Japan Cup. This win also gave him a title in 14 consecutive seasons, one short of Anthony's 1970–84 run.
 The PBA's 17th and 18th televised 300 games were bowled this season: Tony Reyes rolled the first at the Motor City Classic; Ryan Shafer rolled the second at the Pepsi Championship. Shafer's string of strikes was eventually snapped at 18, besting Paul Koehler's previous record of 15 consecutive strikes on TV over two matches (1995 U.S. Open).
 Sean Rash became just the second bowler (Hugh Miller was the other) to win titles in his first three televised appearances.
 Doug Kent became just the sixth PBA player in history to win two major titles in a season, capturing the USBC Masters and Denny's World Championship en route to PBA Player of the Year honors.
 In winning the 64th U.S. Open, Pete Weber tied Anthony's then-record of eight majors won (not counting ABC Masters titles before 2003) and, along with his father Dick Weber, became the only bowler to win four U.S. Open/BPAA All-Star titles since the inception of the PBA in 1958.
 In winning the season-ending PBA Tournament of Champions, Tommy Jones broke Dick Weber's 45-year-old record for the shortest time span between his 1st and 10th career titles (2 years, 6 months, 7 days).
 Norm Duke posted a 228.47 average, the highest ever for a PBA season.
 The Motel 6 Roll To Riches event marked announcer Dave Ryan's final PBA event.  Ryan would be replaced the following season by Rob Stone.

Awards and Leaders
Player Of The Year: Doug Kent
Rookie Of The Year: Billy Oatman
Money Leader: Doug Kent ($200,530)
High Average Award: Norm Duke (228.47)

Tournament results
 Majors are noted in boldface.

Other events

Motel 6 Roll To Riches
Doug Kent capped his Player of the Year honors with a defeat of Norm Duke, six strikes to three. Kent previously survived a sudden-death rolloff against Walter Ray Williams Jr. to advance to the final.

GEICO All-Star Shootout
Norm Duke & Walter Ray Williams Jr. won this event, held outdoors in Eureka, MO, defeating Tony Reyes and Robert Smith as they posted a 6-1 tournament record. This was the PBA's first outdoor event since 2001.

References

External links
2006–07 Season Schedule

Professional Bowlers Association seasons
2006 in bowling
2007 in bowling